On the Mountain of Tai Hang is a 2005 Chinese film about the newly formed Eighth Route Army, led by general commander Zhu De, marching east cross the Yellow River to form Mount Tai Hang military region during the Second Sino-Japanese War. It was produced by the People's Liberation Army-associated August First Film Studio and directed by Wei Lian, Shen Dong and Chen Jian. The film stars Wang Wufu (as Zhu De), Lu Qi (as Deng Xiaoping).

The film won the 25th Golden Rooster Award for Best Picture in 2005.

Cast
 Wang Wufu as Zhu De
 Zong Liqun as Peng Dehuai
 Li Shusheng as Zuo Quan
 Zhang Lin as Ren Bishi
 Lu Qi as Deng Xiaoping
 Li Youbin as Zhu Huaibing
 Tony Leung Ka-fai as He Bingyan
 Liu Dekai as Hao Mengling
 Kudō Shunsaku as Abe Norihide
 Wu Yue as Chen Xilian
 Anna as Agnes Smedley

External links

On the Mountain of Tai Hang at the Chinese Movie Database

2005 films
Chinese war drama films
2000s Mandarin-language films
Second Sino-Japanese War films
Golden Rooster Best Film recipients